The Men's 200m Breaststroke event at the 2003 Pan American Games took place on August 15, 2003 (day 15 of the Games). USA's Kyle Salyards won the race in 2:13.37, another Games record, with four swimmers contesting the remaining podium spots. Sean Quinn (USA) took the silver in 2:15.77 and Marcelo Tomazini (BRA) the bronze in 2:15.87. Only 1/100 behind Thiago Pereira (BRA) in fourth and Scott Dickens (CAN) in fifth in 2:15.94.

Medalists

Records

Results

Notes

References
usaswimming
2003 Pan American Games Results: Day 13, CBC online; retrieved 2009-06-13.
Records

Breaststroke, Men's 200m